Abhay Negi (born 18 October 1992) is an Indian cricketer. He made his List A debut for Meghalaya in the 2018–19 Vijay Hazare Trophy on 20 September 2018. He was the joint-leading wicket-taker for Meghalaya in the 2018–19 Vijay Hazare Trophy, with fourteen dismissals in eight matches. He made his first-class debut for Meghalaya in the 2018–19 Ranji Trophy on 1 November 2018.

References

External links
 

1992 births
Living people
Indian cricketers
Meghalaya cricketers
Place of birth missing (living people)